The Book of Numbers (from Greek Ἀριθμοί, Arithmoi; , Bəmīḏbar, "In the desert [of]") is the fourth book of the Hebrew Bible, and the fourth of five books of the Jewish Torah. The book has a long and complex history; its final form is possibly due to a Priestly redaction (i.e., editing) of a Yahwistic source made some time in the early Persian period (5th century BC).  The name of the book comes from the two censuses taken of the Israelites.

Numbers begins at Mount Sinai, where the Israelites have received their laws and covenant from God and God has taken up residence among them in the sanctuary. The task before them is to take possession of the Promised Land. The people are counted and preparations are made for resuming their march. The Israelites begin the journey, but they "grumble" at the hardships along the way, and about the authority of Moses and Aaron.  For these acts, God destroys approximately 15,000 of them through various means.  They arrive at the borders of Canaan and send spies into the land. Upon hearing the spies' fearful report concerning the conditions in Canaan, the Israelites refuse to take possession of it. God condemns them to death in the wilderness until a new generation can grow up and carry out the task. The book ends with the new generation of Israelites in the "plains of Moab" ready for the crossing of the Jordan River.

Numbers is the culmination of the story of Israel's exodus from oppression in Egypt and their journey to take possession of the land God promised their fathers. As such it draws to a conclusion the themes introduced in Genesis and played out in Exodus and Leviticus: God has promised the Israelites that they shall become a great (i.e. numerous) nation, that they will have a special relationship with Yahweh their god, and that they shall take possession of the land of Canaan. Numbers also demonstrates the importance of holiness, faithfulness and trust: despite God's presence and his priests, Israel lacks in faith and the possession of the land is left to a new generation.

Structure
Most commentators divide Numbers into three sections based on locale (Mount Sinai, Kadesh-Barnea and the plains of Moab), linked by two travel sections; an alternative is to see it as structured around the two generations of those condemned to die in the wilderness and the new generation who will enter Canaan, making a theological distinction between the disobedience of the first generation and the obedience of the second.

Summary

God orders Moses, in the wilderness of Sinai, to number those able to bear arms—of all the men twenty years and older and to appoint princes over each tribe. A total of 603,550 Israelites are found to be fit for military service. The tribe of Levi is exempted from military service and therefore not included in the census.  Moses consecrates the Levites for the service of the Tabernacle in the place of the first-born sons, who hitherto had performed that service. The Levites are divided into three families, the Gershonites, the Kohathites, and the Merarites, each under a chief. The Kohathites were headed by Eleazar, son of Aaron, while the Gershonites and Merarites were headed by Aaron's other son, Ithamar. Preparations are then made for resuming the march to the Promised Land. Various ordinances and laws are decreed.

The Israelites set out from Sinai. The people murmur against God and are punished by fire; Moses complains of their stubbornness and is ordered to choose seventy elders to assist him in the government of the people. Miriam and Aaron insult Moses at Hazeroth, which angers God; Miriam is punished with leprosy and is shut out of camp for seven days, at the end of which the Israelites proceed to the desert of Paran on the border of Canaan. Twelve spies are sent out into Canaan and come back to report to Moses. Joshua and Caleb, two of the spies, report that the land is abundant and is "flowing with milk and honey", but the other spies say that it is inhabited by giants, and the Israelites refuse to enter the land. Yahweh decrees that the Israelites will be punished for their loss of faith by having to wander in the wilderness for 40 years.

God orders Moses to make plates to cover the altar. The children of Israel murmur against Moses and Aaron on account of the destruction of Korah's men and are stricken with the plague, with 14,700 perishing. Aaron and his family are declared by God to be responsible for any iniquity committed in connection with the sanctuary. The Levites are again appointed to help in the keeping of the Tabernacle. The Levites are ordered to surrender to the priests a part of the tithes taken to them.

Miriam dies at Kadesh Barnea and the Israelites set out for Moab, on Canaan's eastern border. The Israelites blame Moses for the lack of water. Moses is ordered by God to speak to a rock but initially disobeys, and is punished by the announcement that he shall not enter Canaan. The king of Edom refuses permission to pass through his land and they go around it. Aaron dies on Mount Hor. The Israelites are bitten by Fiery flying serpents for speaking against God and Moses. A brazen serpent is made to ward off these serpents.

The Israelites arrive on the plains of Moab, across the River Jordan from Jericho. Here, the Israelites find themselves in conflict with the Amorites and Og, king of Bashan, both of whom they defeat. Balak, king of Moab decides to fight the Israelites as well, and summons a local diviner named Balaam to curse the Israelites. However, God tells Balaam not to curse them, and when Balaam attempts to travel to Balak with the Moabite officials God sends an angel to stop his donkey. Realising that he cannot curse the Israelites, Balaam blesses them instead, and foresees a figure whom he identifies as 'the Star of Jacob' who will defeat Israel's enemies. This angers Balak, but Balaam informs Balak that he cannot say anything except what God tells him to say.

The longer the Israelites stay on the plains of Shittim, the more they intermarry with the local Moabites, and the more they participate in the local religion, worshipping a deity known as Baal-Peor. God sends a plague in retaliation, and Moses tells the judges to kill anyone participating in this practice. When one of Aaron's grandsons, Phinehas, finds out a Simeonite prince named Zimri has married a Midianite woman named Cozbi, he enters their tent and runs a spear through them. God rewards him by giving his descendants an everlasting priesthood. God also tells the Israelites to consider the Midianites their enemies.

A new census gives the total number of males from twenty years and upward as 601,730, and the number of the Levites from the age of one month and upward as 23,000. The land shall be divided by lot. The daughters of Zelophehad, who had no sons, are to share in the allotment. Moses is ordered to appoint Joshua as his successor. Prescriptions for the observance of the feasts and the offerings for different occasions are enumerated. Moses orders the Israelites to massacre the people of Midian, in retaliation for the Baal-Peor incident. The Reubenites and the Gadites request Moses to assign them the land east of the Jordan. Moses grants their request after they promise to help in the conquest of the land west of the Jordan. The land east of the Jordan is divided among the tribes of Reuben, Gad, and the half-tribe of Manasseh. Moses recalls the stations at which the Israelites halted during their forty years' wanderings and instructs the Israelites to exterminate the Canaanites and destroy their idols. The boundaries of the land are spelled out; the land is to be divided under the supervision of Eleazar, Joshua, and twelve princes, one of each tribe.

Composition

The majority of modern biblical scholars believe that the Torah (the books of Genesis, Exodus, Leviticus, Numbers, and Deuteronomy) reached its present form in the post-Exilic period (i.e., after c.520 BC), based on pre-existing written and oral traditions, as well as contemporary geographical and political realities. The five books are often described as being drawn from four "sources" - schools of writers rather than individuals - the Yahwist and the Elohist (frequently treated as a single source), the Priestly source and the Deuteronomist. There is an ongoing dispute over the origins of the non-Priestly source(s), but it is generally agreed that the Priestly source is post-exilic. 
Genesis is made up of Priestly and non-Priestly material.
Exodus is an anthology drawn from nearly all periods of Israel's history.
Leviticus is entirely Priestly and dates from the exilic/post-exilic period.
Numbers is a Priestly redaction (i.e., editing) of a non-Priestly original.
Deuteronomy, now the last book of the Torah, began as the set of religious laws (these make up the bulk of the book), was extended in the early part of the 6th century BCE to serve as the introduction to the Deuteronomistic history (the books from Joshua to Kings), and later still was detached from that history, extended and edited again, and attached to the Torah.

Themes

David A. Clines, in his influential The Themes of the Pentateuch (1978), identified the overarching theme of the five books as the partial fulfilment of a promise made by God to the patriarchs, Abraham, Isaac and Jacob. The promise has three elements: posterity (i.e., descendants – Abraham is told that his descendants will be as innumerable as the stars), divine-human relationship (Israel is to be God's chosen people), and land (the land of Canaan, cursed by Noah immediately after the Deluge).

The theme of the divine-human relationship is expressed, or managed, through a series of covenants (meaning treaties, legally binding agreements) stretching from Genesis to Deuteronomy and beyond. The first is the covenant between God and Noah immediately after the Deluge in which God agrees never again to destroy the Earth with water. The next is between God and Abraham, and the third between God and all Israel at Mount Sinai. In this third covenant, unlike the first two, God hands down an elaborate set of laws (scattered through Exodus, Leviticus, and Numbers), which the Israelites are to observe; they are also to remain faithful to Yahweh, the god of Israel, meaning, among other things, that they must put their trust in his help.

The theme of descendants marks the first event in Numbers, the census of Israel's fighting men: the huge number which results (over 600,000) demonstrates the fulfillment of God's promise to Abraham of innumerable descendants, as well as serving as God's guarantee of victory in Canaan. As chapters 1–10 progress, the theme of God's presence with Israel comes to the fore: these chapters describe how Israel is to be organized around the Sanctuary, God's dwelling-place in their midst, under the charge of the Levites and priests, in preparation for the conquest of the land.

The Israelites then set out to conquer the land, but almost immediately they refuse to enter it, and Yahweh condemns the whole generation who left Egypt to die in the wilderness. The message is clear: failure was not due to any fault in the preparation, because Yahweh had foreseen everything, but to Israel's sin of unfaithfulness. In the final section, the Israelites of the new generation follow Yahweh's instructions as given through Moses and are successful in all they attempt. The last five chapters are exclusively concerned with land: instructions for the extermination of the Canaanites, the demarcation of the boundaries of the land, how the land is to be divided, holy cities for the Levites and "cities of refuge", the problem of pollution of the land by blood, and regulations for inheritance when a male heir is lacking.

Judaism's weekly Torah portions in the Book of Numbers 

 Bemidbar, on Numbers 1–4: First census, priestly duties
 Naso, on Numbers 4–7: Priestly duties, the camp, unfaithfulness, and the Nazirite, Tabernacle consecration
 Behaalotecha, on Numbers 8–12: Levites, journeying by cloud and fire, complaints, questioning of Moses
 Shlach, on Numbers 13–15: Mixed report of the scouts and Israel's response, libations, bread, idol worship, fringes
 Korach, on Numbers 16–18: Korah's rebellion, plague, Aaron's staff buds, duties of the Levites
 Chukat, on Numbers 19–21: Red heifer, water from a rock, Miriam's and Aaron's deaths, victories, serpents
 Balak, on Numbers 22–25: Balaam's donkey and blessing
 Pinechas, on Numbers 25–29: Phinehas, second census, inheritance, Moses' successor, offerings and holidays
 Matot, on Numbers 30–32: Vows, Midian, dividing booty, land for Reuben, Gad, and half of Manasseh
 Masei, on Numbers 33–36: Stations of the Israelites’ journeys, instructions for conquest, cities for Levites

See also
 Balaam
 Book of the Wars of the Lord
 Inverted nun (only appears twice in the Book of Numbers and seven times in the Book of Psalms)
 Ketef Hinnom scrolls
 Priestly Blessing
 Torah
 What hath God wrought (disambiguation)
 Wilderness of Sin

References

Citations

Sources

 

  

Plaut, Gunther. The Torah: A Modern Commentary (1981),

Further reading

External links

 במדבר Bamidbar – Numbers (Hebrew – English at Mechon-Mamre.org)

Translations
Jewish translations:
 Numbers at Mechon-Mamre (Jewish Publication Society translation)
 Numbers (The Living Torah)  Rabbi Aryeh Kaplan's translation and commentary at Ort.org
 Bamidbar – Numbers (Judaica Press) translation [with Rashi's commentary] at Chabad.org
Christian translations:
 Numbers
 Online Bible at GospelHall.org  (King James Version)
 oremus Bible Browser (New Revised Standard Version)
 oremus Bible Browser (Anglicized New Revised Standard Version)
 Numbers at Wikisource (Authorized King James Version)
 Numbers at drbo.org (Douay-Rheims Version)
  Various versions

 
5th-century BC books
4
The Exodus